The Istituto Geografico Militare (IGM), or Military Geographic Institute, is an Italian public organization, dependent on the Italian Army general staff (Stato Maggiore dell'Esercito). It is the national mapping agency for Italy.

Overview
Its headquarters are in via Cesare Battisti, Florence, and they occupy most part of Santissima Annunziata cloister. It was established by king Vittorio Emanuele II in 1861 and it is ruled by the law n. 68 February 2, 1960.

References

External links

 

Geography of Italy
Government of Italy
National mapping agencies
Italian Army
1861 establishments in Italy